Campbell Davidson (May 22, 1877 – February 16, 1940) was a Canadian ice hockey player for the Montreal Victorias during the late 19th century. He was a member of two Stanley Cup championship teams with the Victorias, in 1897 and 1899.

Cam (or Cammy) Davidson was a younger brother of Shirley Davidson who also played on the Victorias in the AHAC. Their father was lawyer and judge Charles Peers Davidson. The two brothers learned hockey with the junior Victorias and at McGill University. Cam Davidson graduated in medicine from McGill University and was known as Dr. Campbell Davidson later in his life.

Davidson died on February 16, 1940, in Qualicum Beach, British Columbia, and is buried at Qualicum Beach Cemetery.

References

Notes

1877 births
1940 deaths
Stanley Cup champions
Montreal Victorias players
Canadian ice hockey forwards